The Kuwaiti Family Committee is an organization that was formed in 2004 by relatives of the Kuwaiti detainees in Guantanamo Bay. The Committee advocates for due process for the detainees.

Khalid al-Odah is the founder of the Kuwaiti Family Committee.  His son, Fawzi al-Odah has been detained without charge since 2001.

Capture
The Kuwaiti detainees at Guantanamo Bay maintain that they were doing charitable work in the Afghanistan/Pakistan border region in 2001 when they were captured by Pakistani bounty hunters. The Pakistanis then turned the prisoners over to the Americans who transferred them to Guantanamo Bay.

Kuwaitis in Guantanamo Bay
When Guantanamo Bay first opened in January 2002, there were twelve Kuwaiti citizens being held in the prison.  Six Kuwaitis were released in November 2005 and two more were repatriated to Kuwait in September 2006. At the time, attorney David J. Cynamon cited diplomacy between the Kuwaiti and US governments as key to securing the release of these prisoners.

Prisoners Deserve a Fair Trial
The Kuwaiti Family Committee maintains that the U.S. Constitution guarantees all individuals a fair trial and that the US Supreme Court has affirmed that guarantee in three separate decisions: Rasul v. Bush & Al-Odah v. United States, Hamdi v. Rumsfeld, and Hamdan v. Rumsfeld.

External links
 Put My Son on Trial -- Or Free Him  Op-ed by Khalid in The Washington Post
 Prisoner's father hopes courts find, fix 'big mistake' Article about Khalid in USA Today

Guantanamo Bay detention camp